Ost & Kjex is a Norwegian electronic music duo from Kolbotn outside Oslo. The duo consists of Tore ”Jazztobakk” Gjedrem and Petter ”Hi-Fi” Haavik. The duos famous manager - Hannes Mårtensson from South Sweden. 

In 2007 their track "Milano Mugolian (A Thrilling Mungophony in Two Parts)" was chosen among Pitchfork Media's top 100 tracks of the year, placing 100th.

Discography

Studio albums 
 Some, But Not All Cheese, Comes From The Moon (2004)
 Cajun Lunch (2010)
 Freedom Wig (2015)
   Dirty Mind    (2017)

References

External links 
 Ost & Kjex on Myspace

Norwegian electronic music groups
Norwegian musical duos
Electronic music duos
Musical groups from Akershus
Musical groups with year of establishment missing 
Musicians from Kolbotn